Björgvin Björgvinsson (born 11 February 1949) is an Icelandic former handball player who competed in the 1972 Summer Olympics.

References

1949 births
Living people
Bjorgvin Bjorgvinsson
Bjorgvin Bjorgvinsson
Handball players at the 1972 Summer Olympics